Bruce Alexander Watt (12 March 1939 – 15 July 2021) was a New Zealand rugby union player. He played 29 matches for the All Blacks including eight internationals. He later coached extensively among regional junior teams. He was also a cricketer who played Hawke Cup cricket for Rangitikei.

Watt died in Tawa on 15 July 2021.

References

External links
 Bruce Watt at Christchurch Football Club website

1939 births
2021 deaths
People from Marton, New Zealand
New Zealand rugby union players
New Zealand international rugby union players
Wanganui rugby union players
Canterbury rugby union players
Rugby union fly-halves
New Zealand rugby union coaches